Ralf Törngren's cabinet was the 38th government of the Republic of Finland. The cabinet's time period was from May 5, 1954 to October 20, 1954. It was a majority government.

 

Torngren
1954 establishments in Finland
1954 disestablishments in Finland
Cabinets established in 1954
Cabinets disestablished in 1954